The Newark Museum of Art, formerly known as the Newark Museum, in Newark, Essex County, New Jersey is the state's largest museum. It holds major collections of American art, decorative arts, contemporary art, and arts of Asia, Africa, the Americas, and the ancient world.  Its extensive collections of American art include works by Hiram Powers, Thomas Cole, John Singer Sargent, Albert Bierstadt, Frederick Church, Childe Hassam, Mary Cassatt, Edward Hopper, Georgia O'Keeffe, Joseph Stella, Tony Smith and Frank Stella.

The museum's Tibetan art galleries are considered among the best in the world.  The collection was purchased from Christian missionaries in the early twentieth century.  The Tibetan galleries have an in-situ Buddhist altar that the Dalai Lama has consecrated.   In addition to its extensive art collections, the Newark Museum of Art is dedicated to natural science. It includes the Dreyfuss Planetarium and the Victoria Hall of Science which highlights selections from the museum's 70,000 specimen Natural Science Collection. The Alice Ransom Dreyfuss Memorial Garden, located behind the museum, houses numerous works of contemporary sculpture and is the setting for community programs, concerts and performances. The garden is also home to a 1784 old stone schoolhouse and the Newark Fire Museum.

The museum was founded in 1909 by librarian and reformer John Cotton Dana. As the charter described it, the purpose was "to establish in the City of Newark, New Jersey, a museum for the reception and exhibition of articles of art, science, history and technology, and for the encouragement of the study of the arts and sciences." The kernel of the museum was a collection of Japanese prints, silks, and porcelains assembled by a Newark pharmacist.

Originally located on the fourth floor of the Newark Public Library, the museum moved into its own purpose-built structure in the 1920s on Washington Park after a gift by Louis Bamberger. It was designed by Jarvis Hunt, who also designed Bamberger's flagship Newark store. Since then, the museum has expanded several times, to the south into the red brick former YMCA and to the north into the 1885 Ballantine House, by means of a four-year, $23 million renovation. In 1990, the museum expanded to the west into an existing acquired building. At that time much of the museum, including the new addition, was redesigned by Michael Graves.

The museum had a mini-zoo with small animals for some twenty years, until August 2010.

For the security of climate-sensitive artwork, the museum closed its front entrance to the public in 1997 to minimize the effects of temperature and humidity changes. However, in February 2018, after extensive renovation and the construction of a ramp for disabled access, the front doors were reopened.

On November 6, 2019, the museum changed its name to "The Newark Museum of Art" to highlight the focus of the museum on its art collection which was ranked 12th in the country.

The Newark Black Film Festival was founded in conjunction with the Museum and was formerly held every summer on the Museum campus.

The museum is open daily from 11:00 a.m. to 5:00 p.m.

The Ballantine House
The Ballantine house is a preserved and restored house from the Victorian Era, designed by architect George Edward Harney. It was home to John Holme Ballantine, his wife, Jeannette, and their children, John, Robert, Alice, and Percy. Mr. Ballantine owned and ran a brewery in the Ironbound section of Newark. The house originally had twenty-seven rooms and three floors. In 1937, the Newark Museum bought the house and has since restored it to serve as galleries for the extensive decorative arts collections.

Notes

References

External links 
 The Newark Museum of Art
Dreyfuss Planetarium
  - article on Museum
The Newark Museum of Art within Google Arts & Culture

Culture of Newark, New Jersey
Planetaria in the United States
Art museums and galleries in New Jersey
Asian art museums in the United States
Newark Museum of Art
Natural history museums in New Jersey
Museums in Newark, New Jersey
Michael Graves buildings
Art museums established in 1909
1909 establishments in New Jersey
Historic district contributing properties in Newark, New Jersey
National Register of Historic Places in Newark, New Jersey
Association of Science-Technology Centers member institutions
New Jersey Register of Historic Places
Non-profit organizations based in New Jersey
New Classical architecture
African art museums in the United States